Russell Lloyd may refer to:

Russell G. Lloyd Sr. (1932–1980), American politician, mayor of Evansville, 1972–1980
Russell G. Lloyd Jr. (born 1950), American politician, mayor of Evansville, 2000–2004, son of Russell G. Lloyd Sr.
Russell Lloyd (film editor) (1916–2008), British-born American film editor